Andrew Carr MacKenzie (1911–2001) was a journalist, novelist and parapsychologist from New Zealand.

He started a journalistic career and worked between 1928 and 1938 for The Evening Post of Wellington. He later moved from New Zealand to England where he became a columnist for Kemsley Newspapers.

MacKenzie was a writer of detective stories. He was vice president of the Society for Psychical Research and has been described as a leading researcher in the field of psychical research in the 1970s. He died at his home in Hove, East Sussex in 2001.

Publications

Fiction

Police Superintendent series Branigan

The House at the Estuary (1948) 
Search in the Dark (1948) 
Splash of Red (1949) 
Whisper If You Dare! (1950) 
The Man Who Wanted to Die (1951) 
Point of a Gun (1951)

Nicholas Cornish detective series

Always Fight Back (1955) 
Three Hours to Hang (1955) 
A Grave Is Waiting (1957) 
The Reaching Hand (1957) 
Shadow of a Spy (1958) 
A Man From the Past (1958) 
The Missile (1959)

Non-fiction

The Unexplained: Some Strange Cases In Psychical Research (1966) 
Frontiers of The Unknown: The Insights of Psychical Research (1968) 
Apparitions and Ghosts: A Modern Study (1971) 
A Gallery of Ghosts: An Anthology of Reported Experience (1973) 
The Riddle of The Future: A Study of Modern Precognition (1974) 
Dracula Country: Travels and Folk Beliefs in Romania (1977) 
Voting in Local Elections In New Zealand (1978) 
Hauntings and Apparitions: An Investigation of The Evidence (1982) 
Romanian Journey (1983) 
The History of Transylvania (1983) 
A Concise History of Romania (1985)
Archaeology in Romania (1986) 
The Seen and the Unseen (1987) 
Music in Black Age (1992) 
Adventures in Time: Encounters with The Past (1997)

References 

1911 births
2001 deaths
Parapsychologists
20th-century New Zealand journalists
New Zealand emigrants to the United Kingdom